Glenkeen is a townland in the civil parish of the same name
in County Tipperary.

The glebe house for the Church of Ireland parish of Glenkeen was located in this townland and had a glebe of 11 acres.
The glebe house was built in 1785, a few years after the construction of a Church of Ireland parish church in the nearby town of Borrisoleigh. After this church was closed, the glebe house was sold in 1870 to a Martin Ryan, an ancestor of the present-day owners.

References

Townlands of County Tipperary